Tillandsia heterophylla is a species of evergreen flowering plant in the genus Tillandsia. It is endemic to Mexico.

References

heterophylla
Flora of Mexico